Sunland may refer to:

Places
In Canada:
 Sunland, Alberta, a locality in Lamont County

In South Africa:
 Sunland, Eastern Cape, on the list of cities and towns in the Eastern Cape province

In the United States:
 Sunland, Inyo County, California
 Sunland-Tujunga, Los Angeles, California
 Sunland, Tulare County, California, on the list of places in California
 Sunland, Florida in Seminole County, on the list of places in Florida
 Sunland Estates, Washington, a census-designated place in Grant County

Other uses
 Sunland (train), a Seaboard Air Line train, on the list of named passenger trains of the United States
 Sunland Hospital, a defunct mental health chain in Florida
 Sunland Group, an Australian property development company

See also
 Sunland Park (disambiguation)
 Sunlands, South Australia, a settlement on the Murray River